The Austerlitz format, also "North-Trilateral" or "Slavkov trilateral", is a loose cooperation between the Central European countries Czech Republic, Slovakia and Austria.

Name 
The name derives from the South Moravian city Austerlitz. It is known for the Battle of Austerlitz of 1805, which is also called the "Battle of the Three Emperors".

Background 
On the 15 February 1991 the Visegrád Group was formed as a cooperation between the central European countries of Poland, Czech Republic, Slovakia and Hungary, and there was a push to expand this group to include Slovenia and Austria. On 3 April 2014, the Czech President Miloš Zeman announced at a press conference in Ljubljana that Slovenia and Austria will also participate in the meetings of an enlarged Visegrád group in the future. However, the next day, Hungarian Ministry of Foreign Affairs by his spokesman, Gábor Kaleta, stated that an expansion of the Visegrád Group is not planned, thus rejecting Zeman's offer to Slovenia and Austria.

Apart from Hungary's reluctance to include Slovenia and Austria in the Visegrád Group, the different points of view regarding the Russian sanctions in the wake of the Ukraine conflict that had begun in 2014 on one hand and the three states of the Czech Republic, Slovakia and Austria on the other proved to be an obstacle for an expansion of the Visegrád group. It was therefore necessary to find a different framework for enhanced cooperation. On January 29, 2015, the Prime Minister of Czech Republic Bohuslav Sobotka and Slovakia Robert Fico and the Austrian Chancellor Werner Faymann came together in Slavkov u Brna, Austerlitz near Brno. The 'Austerlitz Declaration' was signed and the Austerlitz framework for mutual co-operation was launched.

Petr Drulák, the deputy minister of the Czech Republic, emphasized, however, that the Austerlitz framework was not a competitor, but a complement to the Visegrád group.

References  

Agreements